J. G. Sandom (born December 19, 1956) is an American businessman and author, who co-founded the nation's first digital advertising agency, Einstein and Sandom Interactive (EASI), in 1984.

Life and work

Sandom grew up in Europe, passing five years in Rome, and was educated at Winchester College. In 1984, Sandom co-founded Einstein and Sandom Interactive (EASI). In 1994 it was purchased by D'Arcy Masius Benton & Bowles. From January 1997 to October 1999, Sandom served as Director of Interactive at OgilvyOne Worldwide, a division of Ogilvy & Mather. Sandom built OgilvyInteractive to $300 million in billings, and Adweek credited him with turning Ogilvy’s digital offering around. From October 1999 Sandom served as President and CEO, and then Vice Chairman of RappDigital Worldwide, an arm of the agency Omnicom.

Sandom is the author of eleven novels. He writes novels for adults under his own name and has used the pen name T.K. Welsh for some of his young adult (YA) books. Ranked one of the Top Ten Children's Books of 2006 by the Washington Post, his debut novel for young adults Kiss Me, I'm Dead (originally released under the title The Unresolved), was nominated for a Young Adult Library Services Association 2007 "Teens' Top Ten", named a 2007 Association of Jewish Libraries "Notable Book for Teens" by the Sydney Taylor Book Award Committee, and nominated for the 2006 "Cybils" award. The Washington Post said that Sandom "writes with a precision and delicacy unusual for YA fiction" and called the novel, "a subtle gem".

Sandom's novel, The Wave, was reissued in June 2010 by Cornucopia Press. Kirkus Reviews said Sandom's characterizations of heroes and "stock bad guys" were drifting into caricature but lauded the story's pacing, concluding: "A story with enough manic energy to be worthy of a nuclear explosion and enough to render moot any structural weaknesses in its architecture."

Sandom is also the chair of Mnemania, Inc., the holding company behind Cremstar and MemoryBox. Cremstar is described as the #1 name in direct cremations online and was recently called the “Uber of Ashes” by the Philadelphia Business Journal. Unlike traditional cremations, direct cremations don’t include embalming, a casket, or a formal memorial service. Today, more people are opting for cremations than traditional burials. MemoryBox is the nation’s premier memorialization website and digital cemetery. Each Cremstar customer also gets an online memorial at MemoryBox.

References

External links
 J.G. Sandom's Work

Living people
Amherst College alumni
1956 births
American male writers